The State Attorney  office (Praklitut Hamedinah) is one of the central bodies governing law in Israel, and the main body representing the State of Israel in court. The State of Israel, because of the different bodies which it is composed of, needs legal representation inasmuch as it prosecutes, in criminal law, and as it sues or is sued in civil law.

External links 
 Site of the State Attorney

Law of Israel
Government of Israel